Bagabaga College of Education is a teacher education college in Tamale (Sagnarigu District, Northern Region, Ghana). The college is located in Northern Zone zone. It is one of the about 40 public colleges of education in Ghana. The college participated in the DFID-funded T-TEL programme. The college was set up in January 1944 with 17 males students with an objective to  train professional teachers to teach in basic schools. The college is affiliated to the University of Education, Winneba.

History 
Bagabaga College of Education (BATCO) was opened on 31 January 1944 with the motto ‘ ADVANCE WITH THE SCIENCES’ . Seventeen male students were enrolled as pioneer students with Mr. K. J. Dickens as the first principal. Messrs Abu Wemah and J. C. Annan were the other two pioneer members of the teaching staff.

BATCO's mission is to train academically sound, competent and disciplined professional teachers to teach in Ghanaian basic schools. The college has the vision to become the best Teacher Education institution in the Northern sector, and one of the best in the West African sub-region. The college has been called by the following names:

 Tamale Government Training College
 Government Training College
 Bagabaga Specialist Training College
 Bagabaga Training College

Programmes 
Programmes the college has offered over the years:

 1944- 2—year Certificate “B” teacher training course; shortly started the 2 year Certificate ‘A’ post “B” course.
 1961 one-year Rural Agricultural Science course and later upgraded to a two-year Agriculture Science specialist course.
 1967 2-year post secondary teacher training college course.
 1972/73 started 3-year post secondary teacher training course
 1972/73, a two-year specialist course in General Science and Mathematics was started in addition to the already existing Agricultural Science course.
 1983/84 mounted a post-middle modular programme 1987/88 Certificate ‘A’ post-modular teacher programme was introduced (it was short-lived)
 2004/2005 Diploma in Basic Education programme (Regular & Distance) and Certificate ‘A’ 4-year (Distance) course.

Notable alumni 
The college has produced over 7,000 Teachers (of various grades and Categories) for the Ghana Education Service. So many past students have held responsible positions in various spheres of our national life. Notable among these old students who distinguished themselves :

Dr. Hilla Limann -President of the Third Republic of Ghana.

Chief Simon Diedong Dombo - Leader of Opposition in Parliament in 1960.

Alhaji Mumuni Bawumia - Lawyer, former Diplomat, former Chairman of Council of state of the Forth Republic of Ghana and former Chief of Kperiga traditional area Walewale.

Mr. Jatoe Kaleo - Minister of State of the Second Republic of Ghana.

Mr. B. K. Adama - Minister of Defence in the Second Republic of Ghana.

Chief Abeifaa Karbo - Paramount Chief of Lawra traditional area, and former Chairman of Public Services Commission.

Mr. A. A. Asumda- Minister of State in the First Republic of Ghana.

References 

Colleges of Education in Ghana
Northern Region (Ghana)
Educational institutions established in 1944
1944 establishments in Gold Coast (British colony)